Terephthalic acid is an organic compound with formula C6H4(CO2H)2. This white solid is a commodity chemical, used principally as a precursor to the polyester PET, used to make clothing and plastic bottles. Several million tons are produced annually. The common name is derived from the turpentine-producing tree Pistacia terebinthus and phthalic acid.

History
Terephthalic acid was first isolated (from turpentine) by the French chemist Amédée Cailliot (1805–1884) in 1846. Terephthalic acid became industrially important after World War II. Terephthalic acid was produced by oxidation of p-xylene with dilute nitric acid. Air oxidation of p-xylene gives p-toluic acid, which resists further air-oxidation. Conversion of p-toluic acid to methyl p-toluate (CH3C6H4CO2CH3) opens the way for further oxidation to monomethyl terephthalate, which is further esterified to dimethyl terephthalate. In 1955, Mid-Century Corporation and ICI announced the bromide-promoted oxidation of p-toluic acid to terephthalic acid. This innovation enabled the conversion of p-xylene to terephthalic acid without the need to isolate intermediates. Amoco (as Standard Oil of Indiana) purchased the Mid-Century/ICI technology.

Synthesis

Amoco process
In the Amoco process, which is widely adopted worldwide, terephthalic acid is produced by catalytic oxidation of p-xylene:

The process uses a cobalt–manganese–bromide catalyst. The bromide source can be sodium bromide, hydrogen bromide or tetrabromoethane. Bromine functions as a regenerative source of free radicals. Acetic acid is the solvent and compressed air serves as the oxidant. The combination of bromine and acetic acid is highly corrosive, requiring specialized reactors, such as those lined with titanium. A mixture of p-xylene, acetic acid, the catalyst system, and compressed air is fed to a reactor.

Mechanism
The oxidation of p-xylene proceeds by a free radical process. Bromine radicals decompose cobalt and manganese hydroperoxides. The resulting oxygen-based radicals abstract hydrogen from a methyl group, which have weaker C–H bonds than does the aromatic ring. Many intermediates have been isolated. p-xylene is converted to p-toluic acid, which is less reactive than the p-xylene owing to the influence of the electron-withdrawing carboxylic acid group. Incomplete oxidation produces 4-carboxybenzaldehyde (4-CBA), which is often a problematic impurity.

Challenges
Approximately 5% of the acetic acid solvent is lost by decomposition or "burning". Product loss by decarboxylation to benzoic acid is common. The high temperature diminishes oxygen solubility in an already oxygen-starved system. Pure oxygen cannot be used in the traditional system due to hazards of flammable organic–O2 mixtures. Atmospheric air can be used in its place, but once reacted needs to be purified of toxins and ozone depleters such as methylbromide before being released. Additionally, the corrosive nature of bromides at high temperatures requires the reaction be run in expensive titanium reactors.

Alternative reaction media
The use of carbon dioxide overcomes many of the problems with the original industrial process. Because CO2 is a better flame inhibitor than N2, a CO2 environment allows for the use of pure oxygen directly, instead of air, with reduced flammability hazards. The solubility of molecular oxygen in solution is also enhanced in the CO2 environment. Because more oxygen is available to the system, supercritical carbon dioxide (Tc = 31 °C) has more complete oxidation with fewer byproducts, lower carbon monoxide production, less decarboxylation and higher purity than the commercial process.

In supercritical water medium, the oxidation can be effectively catalyzed by MnBr2 with pure O2 in a medium-high temperature. Use of supercritical water instead of acetic acid as a solvent diminishes environmental impact and offers a cost advantage. However, the scope of such reaction systems is limited by the even harsher conditions than the industrial process (300–400 °C, >200 bar).

Promotors and additives
As with any large-scale process, many additives have been investigated for potential beneficial effects. Promising results have been reported with the following.
Ketones act as promoters for formation of the active cobalt(III) catalyst. In particular, ketones with α-methylene groups oxidize to hydroperoxides that are known to oxidize cobalt(II). 2-Butanone is often used.
Zirconium salts enhance the activity of Co-Mn-Br catalysts. Selectivity is also improved.
N-Hydroxyphthalimide is a potential replacement for bromide, which is highly corrosive. The phthalimide functions by formation of the oxyl radical. 
Guanidine inhibits the oxidation of the first methyl but enhances the usually slow oxidation of the toluic acid.

Alternative routes
Terephthalic acid can be prepared in the laboratory by oxidizing many para-disubstituted derivatives of benzene, including caraway oil or a mixture of cymene and cuminol with chromic acid.

Although not commercially significant, there is also the so-called "Henkel process" or "Raecke process", named after the company and patent holder, respectively. This process involves the transfer of carboxylate groups. For example potassium benzoate disproportionates to potassium terephthalate, and potassium phthalate rearranges to potassium terephthalate.

Lummus (now a subsidiary of McDermott International) has reported a route from the dinitrile, which can be obtained by ammoxidation of p-xylene.

Applications
Virtually the entire world's supply of terephthalic acid and dimethyl terephthalate are consumed as precursors to polyethylene terephthalate (PET). World production in 1970 was around 1.75 million tonnes. By 2006, global purified terephthalic acid (PTA) demand had exceeded 30 million tonnes. A smaller, but nevertheless significant, demand for terephthalic acid exists in the production of polybutylene terephthalate and several other engineering polymers.

Other uses
Polyester fibers based on PTA provide easy fabric care, both alone and in blends with natural and other synthetic fibers. Polyester films are used widely in audio and video recording tapes, data storage tapes, photographic films, labels and other sheet material requiring both dimensional stability and toughness.
Terephthalic acid is used in paint as a carrier.
Terephthalic acid is used as a raw material to make terephthalate plasticizers such as dioctyl terephthalate and dibutyl terephthalate.
It is used in the pharmaceutical industry as a raw material for certain drugs.
In addition to these end uses, Terephthalic acid based polyesters and polyamides are also used in hot melt adhesives.
PTA is an important raw material for lower molecular weight saturated polyesters for powder and water-soluble coatings.
In the research laboratory, terephthalic acid has been popularized as a component for the synthesis of metal-organic frameworks.
The analgesic drug oxycodone occasionally comes as a terephthalate salt; however, the more usual salt of oxycodone is the hydrochloride. Pharmacologically, one milligram of hydrochloridum oxycodonae is equivalent to 1.13 mg of terephthalas oxycodonae.
Terephthalic acid is used as a filler in some military smoke grenades, most notably the American M83 smoke grenade and M90 vehicle-employed smoke grenade, producing a thick white smoke that acts as an obscurant in the visual and near-infrared spectrum when burned.

Solubility
Terephthalic acid is poorly soluble in water and alcohols; consequently, until about 1970 terephthalic acid was purified as its dimethyl ester. It sublimes when heated.

|}

Toxicity
Terephthalic acid and its dimethyl ester have very low toxicity, with  >1 g/kg (oral, mouse).

Biodegradation
In Comamonas thiooxydans strain E6, terephthalic acid is biodegraded to protocatechuic acid, a common natural product, via a reaction pathway initiated by terephthalate 1,2-dioxygenase. Combined with the previously known PETase and MHETase, a full pathway for PET plastic degradation can be engineered.

See also
Polycyclohexylenedimethylene terephthalate a thermoplastic polyester formed from terephthalic acid

References

Cited sources

External links and further reading

International Chemical Safety Card 0330

Dicarboxylic acids
Monomers
Benzoic acids
Commodity chemicals